Teague is a global design consultancy headquartered in Seattle, Washington. Established in 1926 by Walter Dorwin Teague, Teague is known for its design contributions through the disciplines of product design, interaction design, environmental design, and mechanical design. The privately held company is particularly recognized for its work in aviation and consumer goods, with clients such as The Boeing Company, Microsoft, Hewlett-Packard, Samsung and Panasonic.

Teague's early role in consumer culture is most popularly associated with designs such as the first Polaroid camera, the UPS truck, Texaco service stations, and the Pringles Chips canister; while Xbox and the Boeing 787 Dreamliner headline Teague's post-2000 design work.

History
In the mid-1920s, Walter Dorwin Teague (1883 to 1960) was one of a group of individuals interested in pioneering the design of products for manufacturers as a distinct occupation. The illustrator and typographer departed an advertising career at New York-based Calkins & Holden to establish Teague as a sole-proprietorship in 1926. As one of the first industrial design firms of its kind, Teague's value proposition was to improve the appearance, function and sales of clients' products, thereby strengthening businesses' brand image while translating the era's cultural context through tangible objects.

Early Expansion
Although product design culture was still limited to the wealthy through the 1930s, Teague pursued strategic relationships with businesses offering products to benefit the masses, citing a loss of concern for appearance in manufacturing when the Industrial Revolution replaced craftsmanship with machinery. In 1927, Teague was commissioned by Eastman Kodak to design cameras, and by the following year had co-located with Kodak in Upstate New York. During what would become a thirty-year relationship, Teague designed some of Kodak's most iconic products, including the Baby Brownie, Super Six-20, Kodak Medalist, and the Kodak Bantam Special, one of the most popular cameras ever produced.  The Baby Brownie had outsold any other camera ever made.

Teague expanded its portfolio in the early 1930s with: the Marmon 16, the first production automobile conceived by an industrial designer; 32 design patterns for Steuben Glass, a division of Corning Glass Works; and the design of passenger cars and diners for the New York, New Haven and Hartford Railroads.  By 1938, Teague's office grew to 55 employees, including architects, engineers, 3D artists and industrial designers. Teague had also signed its first highly lucrative design retainer contract with Polaroid, culminating in the later development of the Land Camera, the first camera able to develop its own prints, introduced in 1948.

Environmental Design and Corporate Identity
Teague's product designs for Kodak evolved into the design of Kodak's offices, retail stores, and exhibitions at the New York World's Fair. The concept of "corporate identity" emerged from this cross-disciplined work of commercial design and the applied arts and science of creating the human-designed environment.  Initiating the first corporate identity program of its kind, Teague created a full branding image for Texaco, including the design of full station layouts for Texaco service stations, pumps, trucks, cans and signs. Considered Art Deco icons of their era, more than 20,000 of these Texaco stations had been built worldwide by 1960.

World Fairs
In the 1930s and 1940s, Teague parlayed the new concept of corporate identity into designing corporate industrial exhibits for companies such as Con Edison, Du Pont, Kodak, US Steel, and the National Cash Register Company. In 1933, Teague designed numerous displays for the Ford Motor Company at the Chicago Century of Progress Exposition, and expanded its showcase of architectural savvy through the design of the Texaco exhibition hall at the 1935 Texas Centennial Exposition in Dallas, Texas, as well as the Ford pavilion for the California Pacific International Exposition in San Diego, California (now housing the San Diego Aerospace Museum). 

Having designed multiple exhibitions at the New York World's Fair, including the Kodak Hall of Lights and the National Cash Register Building, Walter Dorwin Teague was invited to serve on its Board of Design, as well as design the Ford Exposition Building at New York's World Fair of 1939. Teague would also later design the U.S. Science Center for the World's Fair in Seattle, as well as the "House of the Future" for the Festival of Gas at the 1964 World's Fair.

Structure and Scope
By the 1940s, product design culture had only just begun to come of age through consideration of a product's functional, technological, cultural and economic factors. In 1945, a year after establishing an engineering division, Teague's corporate structure changed from a sole proprietorship to a partnership, allowing senior staff to be partners in the company. Profit-sharing increased employee retention and pride in ownership in the company encouraged project-successes.

Diversifying the firm's portfolio, Teague's projects included packaging for Ac'cent, a product for the International Minerals and Chemical Corporation, equipment design for the Navy Bureau of Ordinance of the U.S. Navy, design of the UPS delivery truck and the visual styling of Steinway Pianos, the first of which is on display at the Smithsonian museum (as of 2012).

The 1940s also commenced Teague's collaborative relationship with The Boeing Company, which began in 1946 and continues to date, as of January 2012. (See Aviation.)

Post-War Decades: Product Packaging and Interior Design
Products of mass-consumption and the expansion of pop culture in the 1950s strengthened the influence of industrial design in both public consciousness and big business. By the late 1950s, Teague expanded its work in product packaging design, creating a new corporate identity for Schaefer Beer. This early work would later lead to projects with Ivory soap, Downy, Comet cleanser, Cheetos, Scope mouthwash, Head & Shoulders, and Chiffon margarine. With offices in New York and Seattle, and design labs in several domestic and overseas locations, Teague strengthened its application of package design through the consumer revolution of the 1960s, forming lasting relationships with both Procter & Gamble and the General Foods Corporation.

The Oil Crisis and anger toward American imperialism waned the mass-impact of industrial design for nearly two decades. During the early 1970s, the majority of Teague's work was in architectural and interior design. In addition to banks, showrooms, museums, corporate headquarters, supermarkets and government facilities, Teague's largest space of interior design was for Skidmore, Owings & Merrill's Air Force Academy in Colorado, where design work covered 3.5 million square feet of space, including dining halls, dormitory rooms, classrooms, and more than 60,000 objects.  By 1977, Walter Dorwin Teague Associates was larger than any of its competitors, employing roughly 150 designers, architect and technicians.

As the Information Age and its new media culture surfaced, Teague continued collaborative work with key clients, such as Procter & Gamble and Boeing, and established new client relationships that resulted in numerous classic package designs, including the Lays Potato Chips and Frito Corn Chips bags, the Pringles Potato Chips canister, Ivory, and the Scope Mouthwash Bottle. Other notable post-1975 design achievements include the Kenworth Sleeper truck, the first truck designed to house a sleeper cabin, developed in 1976; and the crew quarters for the NASA space station, designed in 1987.

Aviation
Teague's history in aviation began with Boeing in 1946, when Teague designed the aircraft interior for the Boeing Stratocruiser. The inverted figure-8 double deck fuselage provided 6,600 feet of interior space designed specifically for luxury air travel. The Stratocruiser's interior later inspired the iconic interior cabins of both the Boeing 707 and 747 planes.

The 707 aircraft model marked a "new flight era" for passengers, with more windows, a passenger service unit, illuminated seat-belt signs, and 1,300 square feet of interior space. Boeing's 747, the world's first wide-body commercial jetliner, two and a half times the size of the 707, was used to create the Reagan-era Air Force One in 1988.  The Boeing-Teague team's Air-Force One project received tremendous media attention throughout its development, as the aircraft designed to transport the US President and White House staff included  100 telephones, two fully equipped kitchens, 16 televisions, seven bathrooms, 31 executive sleeper suites, and other extravagant amenities.

In 1997, the collaborative team unveiled the Boeing 737 interior and exterior design at the Paris Air Show, where eight years later the 777-200LR Worldliner would also premier, a model to break distance records during its "Going the Distance" world tour. In January 2012, Boeing announced the 777 once again set a new record for orders in a single year (2011) at 200. The Boeing-Teague team also developed the Boeing Skyloft Concept in 2005, a first-of-its-kind architectural transformation to create a new level of commercial space in cabin real estate.

The result of a five-year collaboration between Boeing and Teague, the Boeing 787 Dreamliner set new world records for distance and speed during an endurance flight around the world in 2011, the year of the 787's first delivery. Dubbed "The New Plane for the New World," the 787 is considered the most successful commercial airplane launch in aviation history.

In 2006, Teague and Boeing celebrated the 60th year anniversary of collaborative aviation design.

Teague's architectural innovation for jetliner interiors includes projects for global airlines, such as Singapore and Emirates airlines. In 2008, Teague earned the international Red Dot Design award for Emirates Airline First-Class Cabin and Entry-Way, designed in collaboration with Boeing, Emirates, and Paris-based Pierrejean Studios to create a dramatic new cabin interior for the airline's 777-models.

Leading the proliferation of in-flight entertainment and communications, Teague has developed both hardware and software for clients like Rockwell-Collins and Panasonic Avionics, with whom Teague's relationship began in the early 1990s. Weber Aircraft, Panasonic and Teague collaboratively developed the first ever fully integrated in-flight entertainment seat for commercial aircraft, the Panasonic Integrated Smart Monitor.

New Millennium: Consumer Electronics
At the turn of the millennium, leveraging collaborative relationships with A-list clients of the Digital Age, Teague's work focused heavily on consumer electronics.

In 2001, Seattle-based Microsoft called on Teague to co-design its first gaming console, the Xbox. The project's success culminated in a series of additional collaborative projects between Microsoft and Teague. Expanding its client-base and award-winning portfolio in the consumer electronics market, Teague collaborated with companies such as Samsung, Panasonic, Gateway, Intel, LG, Hewlett-Packard, and T-Mobile. Widely acclaimed designs include the Samsung Portable Digital Projector, the Gateway One computer, the Xbox 360 Wireless Racing Wheel, and the Microsoft Shell Laptop.

In January 2012, Teague celebrated its 200th project with Microsoft.

Mission & Approach
As part of Teague's post-millennium brand revival, the company reinstated the mission "Design This Day," the title of Walter Dorwin Teague's book, published in 1940. Outlining design techniques and philosophical perspectives, the book serves as Teague's timeless basis through which to approach design. From the book's preface: "What I have tried to do is to outline with reasonable clarity the technique that must be applied to the solution of any problem of design, whether it is a new motorcar or a new city or a new environment. If this technique is basically sound for one it will be sound for the others. It is a method of approach, a listing of the factors that must be dealt with if satisfactory order is to be created on a small or a large scale." –Walter Dorwin Teague, Aug 30, 1949.

The Company's business practice emphasizes collaboration and client-designer relationships, as Walter Dorwin Teague first publicly articulated at the 1946 Museum of Modern Art Conference in New York, "Industrial Design: A New Profession," wherein the meeting minutes reflect Teague's remark, "[W]e wait for the client to come to us." Additionally, Teague has applied a "thinking through making" approach since its founding, using off-site laboratories to build full-scale mock-ups of designs, including aircraft interiors.

Corporate
In 2004, John Barratt signed on as Teague's President and CEO. , Teague employs approximately 300 designers and support staff within the Seattle-based Aviation Studio and Design Studio.

In 2011, Teague acquired a Munich-based design studio to expand into the European market.

References

External links
Teague official website

Companies based in Seattle
Design companies
1926 establishments in New York City